Veikko Vartiainen (20 August 1913 – 11 January 1981) was a Finnish equestrian. He competed at the 1948 Summer Olympics and the 1952 Summer Olympics.

References

1913 births
1981 deaths
Finnish male equestrians
Olympic equestrians of Finland
Equestrians at the 1948 Summer Olympics
Equestrians at the 1952 Summer Olympics
Sportspeople from Tampere